Abdul Aziz Tetteh (born 25 May 1990) is a Ghanaian footballer who last played as a defensive midfielder for Polish club Widzew Łódź.

Career
Tetteh began his career with Dansoman-based Liberty Professionals. He was an integral member of the Liberty Pro. team before signed with Udinese Calcio in January 2008. Tetteh left in summer 2008 Udinese Calcio and joined on loan with Xerez of the Spanish Segunda División. After a year with Xerez he returned to Udinese Calcio which then loaned him to Granada. After spending a few years out on loans he joined Platanias in 2013.

On 31 January 2018, he signed with the Russian club Dynamo Moscow.

On 5 August 2019, Tetteh signed a three-year contract with Turkish Süper Lig club Gazişehir Gaziantep. After two seasons in Turkey, Tetteh returned to Poland, signing a one-year deal with Widzew Łódź on 23 July 2021, with an option to extend it for another two years.

International career
He earned his first call-up in February 2008 for the local national team by French head coach Claude Le Roy for an African Nations Championship match. In March 2008 was called from Head coach Sellas Tetteh in the Black Satellites team.

Career statistics

Club

1 Including Polish SuperCup.

Honours

Club

Lech Poznań
 Polish Super Cup: 2016

References

External links
 
 

1990 births
Living people
Ghanaian footballers
Ghanaian expatriate footballers
Association football midfielders
Ghana international footballers
Liberty Professionals F.C. players
Xerez CD footballers
Granada CF footballers
CD Leganés players
Udinese Calcio players
Platanias F.C. players
Fokikos A.C. players
Lech Poznań players
FC Dynamo Moscow players
Widzew Łódź players
Gaziantep F.K. footballers
Segunda División B players
Super League Greece players
Football League (Greece) players
Ekstraklasa players
Russian Premier League players
I liga players
Ghanaian expatriate sportspeople in Poland
Expatriate footballers in Poland
Ghanaian expatriate sportspeople in Russia
Expatriate footballers in Russia
Ghanaian expatriate sportspeople in Turkey
Expatriate footballers in Turkey
Ghanaian expatriate sportspeople in Spain
Expatriate footballers in Spain
Ghanaian expatriate sportspeople in Italy
Expatriate footballers in Italy
Expatriate footballers in Greece
Ghanaian expatriate sportspeople in Greece